People awarded the Honorary citizenship of the City of Zwolle, Netherlands are:

Honorary Citizens of Zwolle
Listed by date of award:

References

Zwolle